Westgate Methodist Chapel stands on the A689 road in the village of Westgate, some  west of Stanhope, County Durham, England.  It is a redundant chapel under the care of the Historic Chapels Trust, and is recorded in the National Heritage List for England as a designated Grade II* listed building.

History
This was originally a Primitive Methodist chapel.  The area in which it stands, Weardale, has a long history of Primitive Methodism, having been the site of a camp meeting in 1823.  The first chapel in the village was built in 1824.  The present chapel, built in 1871, was designed by George Race junior and a Mr Atkinson.  It cost £1,300 (equivalent to £ as of ), and was attached to the earlier chapel which then became a schoolroom.  The chapel closed in 2007, and was acquired by the Historic Chapels Trust in late 2009.

Architecture
The chapel is constructed in sandstone and has Welsh slate roofs.  It is in two storeys and has five bays.  There are two entrances on the south of the building, a single entrance in the westernmost bay, and a paired entrance in the easternmost bay.  The ground floor windows have square heads, and the upper floor windows are round-headed.  Over the lower windows is a series of inscribed panels.  To the east, and slightly set back, is the former schoolroom, which is also has two storeys, and is in three bays.  The windows are similar to those in the chapel.

Internally, the pulpit is at the west end.  At the east end is an entrance lobby with two flights of stairs leading up to the gallery, which runs round all sides of the chapel.  The gallery is carried on slim cast iron Corinthian columns that rise upwards to form an arcade above.  The body of the chapel and the gallery contain rows of pitch pine pews.  The organ is situated above the pulpit at the west end.  It was built in about 1920 by Nelson & Co. of Durham, and has two manuals.  In front of the pulpit is a dais surrounded by communion rails.  On each side of this are curved doors leading to vestries with a store room between them.  The ceiling contains coving with large panels; it is decorated with stucco leaves, cornices and roundels around the ventilators.

See also
List of chapels preserved by the Historic Chapels Trust

References

Grade II* listed churches in County Durham
Churches completed in 1871
19th-century Methodist church buildings
Former Methodist churches in the United Kingdom
Former churches in County Durham
Churches preserved by the Historic Chapels Trust
Chapels in England
Methodist churches in County Durham
19th-century churches in the United Kingdom
Stanhope, County Durham